Henry F. Wagner (February 11, 1874 – November 10, 1943) was a justice of the Iowa Supreme Court from September 6, 1927, to December 31, 1932, appointed from Keokuk County, Iowa.

References

External links

Justices of the Iowa Supreme Court
1874 births
1943 deaths